Fungisterol is a bio-active sterol made by certain fungi.

References

Sterols